The Pittsburgh Steelers are a professional American football team in Pittsburgh, Pennsylvania. The Steelers compete in the National Football League (NFL) as a member of the American Football Conference (AFC) North division.

Starters per season
These quarterbacks have started at least one game for the Pittsburgh Steelers.

 

The number of games they started during the season is listed to the right of their name:

Most games started
These quarterbacks have the most starts for the Steelers in regular season games.

Team career passing records

See also

 Lists of NFL starting quarterbacks

References

External links
 Pittsburgh Steelers Franchise Encyclopedia
 Pittsburgh Steelers All Time Roster
 Pittsburgh Steelers History
 Pittsburgh Steelers Stats 1935
 The 1959 Pittsburgh Steelers

Pittsburgh Steelers
quarterbacks